Sophronius I served as Greek Patriarch of Alexandria between 841 and 860.

References

9th-century Patriarchs of Alexandria